Qaradaghis or Karadaghis, are a Turkic sub-ethnic group of Azerbaijanis, mainly living in Southern Aras river called Qaradagh in Eastern Azerbaijan, Iran. The Qaradaghis are predominantly Shi'a Muslim and speak the Qaradaghi dialect of the Azerbaijani language.

See also
 Karadagh khanate
 Tribes of Karadagh

References

Ethnic groups in Azerbaijan
Ethnic groups in Iran
Azerbaijani tribes